José Antonio Miranda Boacho (born 22 July 1998), known as Josete Miranda or simply Josete, is a professional footballer who plays as a forward for Greek club Niki Volos. Born in Spain, he represents the Equatorial Guinea national team. He can also operate as a central midfielder.

Club career
Born in Getafe, Community of Madrid, Josete joined Getafe CF's youth setup in 2012, aged 14, after a stint at Real Madrid. In late January 2015 he was called up by manager Pablo Franco to the reserves, being also included on the bench in a 4–3 home win against UD Las Palmas Atlético.

On 8 February 2015, aged only 16, Josete made his senior debut, coming on as a late substitute in a 2–0 away win against UB Conquense in the Segunda División B championship.

International career
A son of an Equatoguinean mother, Josete was called up for Equatorial Guinea national team on 25 March 2015. He made his full international debut on the following day, coming on as a second-half substitute in a 0–2 friendly loss against Egypt. Josete scored the first goal in a 4–0 victory over South Sudan in 2017 Africa Cup of Nations qualifier.

International goals
 (Equatorial Guinea score listed first, score column indicates score after each Miranda goal)

Career statistics

International

References

External links

Getafe official profile 

1998 births
Living people
Citizens of Equatorial Guinea through descent
Equatoguinean footballers
Association football midfielders
Niki Volos F.C. players
Super League Greece 2 players
Equatorial Guinea international footballers
2021 Africa Cup of Nations players
Equatoguinean expatriate footballers
Equatoguinean expatriate sportspeople in Spain
Expatriate footballers in Spain
Equatoguinean expatriate sportspeople in Greece
Expatriate footballers in Greece
Equatoguinean sportspeople of Spanish descent
People of Bubi descent
People from Getafe
Footballers from the Community of Madrid
Spanish footballers
Getafe CF B players
Getafe CF footballers
Segunda División B players
Tercera División players
La Liga players
Spanish sportspeople of Equatoguinean descent
Spanish people of Bubi descent
Spanish expatriate footballers
Spanish expatriate sportspeople in Greece